Larry Knight (born November 5, 1956) is an American former collegiate and professional basketball player. Knight was drafted by the Utah Jazz in the first round (20th pick) of the 1979 National Basketball Association (NBA) draft.

College career 
Knight played collegiately at Ellsworth Community College and at Loyola Chicago. In his two years with the Loyola Ramblers, he grabbed a total of 729 rebounds (13.5 rebounds per game). In 1978-79, Knight averaged a team-high 21.5 points per contest.

Professional career
Knight played for the 1979-80 Anchorage Northern Knights of the Continental Basketball Association (CBA) who won the league championship. He was a 1980 CBA All-League Second Team selection. Knight played two seasons in the CBA, moving to the Billings Volcanos in 1980. He averaged 19.1 points and 14.3 rebounds in 86 games in the league.

He played professionally overseas, including stints in Germany (USC Heidelberg, 1984–85) and the Netherlands (Nashua Den Bosch, 1985–86).

References

1956 births
Living people
American expatriate basketball people in Germany
American expatriate basketball people in the Netherlands
American men's basketball players
Anchorage Northern Knights players
Basketball players from Detroit
Billings Volcanos players
Ellsworth Community College alumni
Junior college men's basketball players in the United States
Loyola Ramblers men's basketball players
Northeastern High School (Michigan) alumni
Power forwards (basketball)
Utah Jazz draft picks